Anna Eynard-Lullin (26 May 1793 - 30 October 1868), was a Swiss philanthropist, born a citizen of Republic of Geneva. She was married to the politician Jean-Gabriel Eynard and was known to have indirectly influenced the Treaty of Paris (1814), Congress of Vienna and the Congress of Aix-la-Chapelle (1818). In Switzerland, she was known for her charitable projects.

References 

 Archives de la famille Eynard (archives de famille, généalogies, mémoires et journaux, récits de voyages), Bibliothèque de Genève, Département des manuscrits : Ms. suppl. 1893-1910, 1921-19848.

1793 births
1868 deaths
People from the canton of Geneva
19th-century Swiss people
Swiss philanthropists
19th-century Swiss women
19th-century philanthropists